Bobrowniki is a village in Lipno County, Kuyavian-Pomeranian Voivodeship, in north-central Poland. It is the seat of the gmina (administrative district) called Gmina Bobrowniki. In the Middle Ages the village was one of the centres of the Dobrzyń Land.

The village contains ruins of the castle, built at the end of 14th century by Teutonic Knights at the place of a former Polish gród. 

Near Bobrowniki, there is a remarkable power line crossing of the Vistula river.

The village has a population of 980.

References

Villages in Lipno County
Płock Governorate
Warsaw Voivodeship (1919–1939)
Pomeranian Voivodeship (1919–1939)